Cottington may refer to:

Francis Cottington, 1st Baron Cottington, Chancellor of the Exchequer under Charles I of England
Gordon Cottington, a Scottish rugby player